Ajaylat Stadium is a multi-purpose stadium in Ajaylat, Libya.  It is currently used mostly for football matches and is the home ground of Al Urouba.  The stadium holds 8,000 people. This season (Libyan Premier League 2008/2009), Wefaq Sabratha will be playing there while their stadium (Sabratha Stadium) is under maintenance.

External links
Stadium information

Football venues in Libya
Multi-purpose stadiums in Libya